Fábio Yabu (born September 1, 1979, in Santos) is a Brazilian comics and book writer. He is the creator of Combo Rangers, one of the pioneering webcomics in Brazil,  and of the Sea Princesses book series and cartoons.

References

External links
 Official site (in Portuguese) 

Brazilian comics writers
Brazilian children's writers
1979 births
Living people
Brazilian people of Japanese descent
People from Santos, São Paulo
Brazilian horror writers